Bear Creek is a stream in Montgomery and Lincoln counties of Missouri. It is a tributary of the West Fork of the Cuivre River.

Bear Creek was named for the fact pioneers encountered bears there.

See also
List of rivers of Missouri

References

Rivers of Lincoln County, Missouri
Rivers of Montgomery County, Missouri
Rivers of Missouri